"S" Bridge II is a historic S bridge near New Concord, Ohio, United States.  A part of the National Road, the first federally-financed highway in the United States, it was built in 1828. In 1973, it was listed on the National Register of Historic Places.

References 

Road bridges on the National Register of Historic Places in Ohio
Buildings and structures in Muskingum County, Ohio
National Register of Historic Places in Muskingum County, Ohio
Transportation in Muskingum County, Ohio
Bridges completed in 1828